Heart of a Siren (also titled Heart of a Temptress) is a 1925 silent romantic drama film directed by Phil Rosen and distributed by First National Pictures. Barbara La Marr starred in one of her last movies. It was based on the Broadway play Hail and Farewell.

Plot
As described in a film magazine review, Isabella is a European siren who plays with men for her amusement. She is scorned by Gerald Rexford, an Englishman, and in revenge she brings him to her feet, but looses her heart to him. They live together until his mother persuades her that she is ruining Gerald's life. She makes him believe that she has given herself to a former admirer and he leaves her. Gerald learns of her sacrifice and returns to her, arriving just after she has supposedly drunk poison. Her watchful attendant, however, had emptied the bottle of poison and replaced it with a harmless liquid. The film ends on the promise of Isabella to marry Gerald.

Cast

Preservation
Prints of The Heart of a Siren are held by the UCLA Film and Television Archive, George Eastman Museum Motion Picture Collection, and Pacific Film Archive.

References

External links

Stills at silenthollywood.com
Still at silentfilmstillarchive.com

1925 films
1925 romantic drama films
American black-and-white films
American romantic drama films
American silent feature films
American films based on plays
Films directed by Phil Rosen
First National Pictures films
1920s American films
Silent romantic drama films
Silent American drama films